Attulus terebratus is a species of spiders from the family Salticidae, found in all European countries except for Belgium, Denmark, Spain, Portugal, the Netherlands, and the former Yugoslavian states. It is also commonly found in Kazakhstan, Mongolia, and Turkey.

Description
This species has eight legs, and eight eyes.  It has a black coloured body, with brownish legs.

References

Spiders described in 1758
Sitticini
Spiders of Asia
Spiders of Europe
Invertebrates of Central Asia
Arthropods of Mongolia
Arthropods of Turkey
Taxa named by Carl Alexander Clerck